Ricardo Arturo Tomasino  (TBA) was a former Salvadoran professional football coach.
He is the son of Salvadoran football Player and coach Carbilio Tomasino.

External links
 El Salvador en Los Juegos Deportivos Centroamericanos y del Caribe - El Balón Cuscatleco 

Salvadoran footballers
Salvadoran football managers
Sportspeople from Santa Ana, El Salvador

Association football midfielders